The Saturn Awards for Best Horror Film is an award presented to the best film in the horror genre by the Academy of Science Fiction, Fantasy and Horror Films.

It was introduced in 1973 for the 1972 film year. For the 2010, 2011 and 2012 film years, it was renamed Best Horror or Thriller Film (with the Best Action, Adventure or Thriller Film category becoming Best Action or Adventure Film). In 2013 the award came back to its original form, with a new Best Thriller Film award being created.

Winners and nominees
In the list below, winners are listed first in bold, followed by the other nominees.

1970s

1980s

1990s

2000s

2010s

2020s

See also
Horror film

External links
Official Site

Horror Film